Meli Rokoua (born ) is a Fijian rugby union player for South African side  in the Currie Cup and in the Rugby Challenge. He is a utility player that can play as a centre, wing or loose forward.

He can play rugby sevens and was named in an extended Fiji national team in 2016.
He was included in VVA Saracens in 2019, who play in the Russian rugby premier league.

References

Fijian rugby union players
Living people
1994 births
Sportspeople from Nadi
Rugby union flankers
Rugby union centres
Rugby union wings
Southern Kings players
Eastern Province Elephants players